The Nine Dome Mosque is a historic mosque in the Mosque City of Bagerhat in Bangladesh. It was built during the governorship of Khan Jahan Ali in the 15th century, under the reign of the Bengal Sultanate. The Nine Dome Mosque is located to the west of the takur dighi tank and built in the 15th century, it is close to Khan Jahan Ali's Tomb. Its western wall conventionally faces west towards Mecca. Close to this mosque are the Zinda Pir Mosque and mazar (tomb), which are in ruins.

Decoration 
It is close to Khan Jahan Ali's Tomb. Its western wall conventionally faces west towards Mecca, where the mihrab is inset on the western wall; terra cotta floral scrolls and flower motifs are the decorations seen around the mihrab. Circular towers are provided in the four corners. The walls of the mosque support a large central dome which has eight smaller domes around it. This structure was also affected by sulphates. It has since been substantially restored.

See also
 List of mosques in Bangladesh
 List of archaeological sites in Bangladesh

References

Bengal Sultanate mosques
Mosques in Bagerhat